Evermode, or Evermod (c. 1100 – 17 February 1178), was one of the first Premonstratensian canons regular, and became the lifelong companion of Norbert of Xanten, who founded the order in France in 1120.

Evermode was born in Belgium. After hearing Norbert preach in the city of Cambrai, he decided to join him. He accompanied  Norbert to Antwerp and then, in 1126, to the half-pagan town of Magdeburg, where Norbert had been named as bishop. He attended to the bishop on his deathbed and ensured his burial in the church of the Norbertine Priory of Our Lady there, which Norbert had formed from the members of the cathedral chapter. A few months before his death in 1134, Norbert appointed Evermode acting provost of the Priory of Gottesgnaden.

In 1138 Evermode was elected as the provost of the Priory of Our Lady in Magdeburg. In this post, he oversaw the foundations of new Premonstratensian communities in Havelberg, Jerichow, Quedlinburg and Pöhlde, serving in that post until 1154, when he was named the Bishop of Ratzeburg, the first since its destruction by the Wends in 1066. He formed the newly named cathedral chapter of the diocese into a Premonstratensian community. The evangelization of the Wendish population was a primary goal of his episcopacy, and he traveled around the diocese, preaching to the people in their native language.

Worn out by his labors, Evermode died in 1178, and was buried in the cathedral he had built. He was succeeded by his fellow Norbertine, Isfrid.

Veneration
His cult was approved by Pope Benedict XIII in 1728. Evermode is honored as a saint in the Roman Catholic Archdiocese of Hamburg, which now covers that region, and in the Norbertine Order. His feast day is celebrated on 17 February.

See also
 Saint Evermode of Ratzeburg, patron saint archive

References

External links
Saint Evermod of Ratzeburg at Saints.SQPN.com
Evermod at Catholic Online
Saint of the Day, February 17: Evermod of Ratzeburg  at SaintPatrickDC.org

 (died 1066)

1100s births
1178 deaths
People from Hainaut (province)
Premonstratensians
Belgian Roman Catholic missionaries
12th-century Roman Catholic bishops in the Holy Roman Empire
Roman Catholic bishops of Ratzeburg
Burials in Schleswig-Holstein